Hednesford (pronounced  ) is a historic market town in the Cannock Chase district of Staffordshire, England. Cannock Chase is to the north, the town of Cannock  to the south and Rugeley  to the southwest.The population at the 2011 census was 17,343. It also comprises the civil parish of Hednesford and part of the civil parish of Brindley Heath.

History
Hednesford was a coal mining community for over a century. This is commemorated in the town centre, where a Miner's Lamp has been erected, surrounded by a wall with individual bricks giving the names of former miners. The oldest sections of the town surround the hilltop areas of the existing town; however, the lower part of the town became the focal point as the community grew with the mining industry.

Between 1914 and 1918 two army training camps were built in the area and over a quarter of a million British and Commonwealth troops passed through destined for the Western Front. In 1938 a Royal Air Force training camp was established to train technicians in maintenance and repair of airframes and engines. No. 6 School of Technical training became better known as RAF Hednesford. The camp was later used for resettlement of Hungarian refugees fleeing from the Russian invasion of Budapest, in 1956. The site is now a part of Cannock Chase Country Park.

The urban area of Hednesford now spreads across a swathe of the northern fringe of Cannock, from Pye Green across to Heath Hayes, and is the southern gateway to Cannock Chase Area of Outstanding Natural Beauty (AONB). Economically Hednesford has suffered since the 1980s as more people travel to the larger towns and cities nearby and due to the absence of redevelopment it retains a traditional street scene with many sole traders operating speciality shops. However, the area around Anglesey Square has been landscaped to provide a public space with a public clock as a central feature. A £50 million regeneration of the town centre has taken place, with an 80,000sq ft Tesco store being the centre piece. Also, a new drill hall for the local Army Cadet Force Detachment, shops and bingo hall were constructed in 2012. The Tesco site is known as Victoria Shopping Park and the Bingo/Aldi site as Chase Gateway. Currently, a £2.2 million grant, from Heritage Lottery Fund Grant, is being used to fund a refurbishment of Hednesford Park.

Demography

Town
In the decade to 2011 the number of dwellings in the town rose by 7.8% to 7,482.
Of the town's 7,277 households in the 2011 census, 25.9% were one-person households including 10.7% where that person was 65 or over. 69.3% were one family with no others (8.2% all pensioners, 39.5% married or same-sex civil partnership couples, 12.6% cohabiting couples and 9.1% lone parents).  29.9% of households had dependent children including 3.4% with no adults in employment. 72.4% of households owned their homes outright or with a mortgage or loan.

Of the town's 14,206 residents in the 2011 census aged 16 and over, 30.6% were single (never married), 51.3% married, 0.15% in a registered same-sex civil partnership, 2.4% separated, 9.0% divorced and 6.5% widowed. 26.0% had no formal qualifications and 50.0% had level 2+ qualifications (meaning 5+ GCSEs (grades A*-C) or 1+ 'A' levels/ AS levels (A-E) or equivalent minimum).

77.3% of the 6,597 men aged 16 to 74 were economically active, including 50.2% working full-time, 5.4% working part-time and 14.6% self-employed. The male unemployment rate (of those economically active) was 6.6% (See also Male unemployment). 67.2% of the 6,515 women aged 16 to 74 were economically active, including 31.9% working full-time, 25.4% working part-time and 3.5% self-employed. The female unemployment rate (of those economically active) was 4.7%.

Of people in employment aged 16 to 74, 14.3% worked in basic industries (ONS categories A, B, and D-F including 12.2% in construction), 13.9% in manufacturing, and 71.8% in service industries (ONS categories G-U including 19.6% in wholesale and retail trade and vehicle repair, 11.9% in health and social work, 8.0% in education, 6.0% in public administration, 5.9% in transport and storage, 4.5% in administrative and support service activities, and 4.0% in accommodation and catering). While 16.9% of households did not have access to a car or van, 84.6% of people in employment travelled to work by car or van.

79.1% of residents described their health as good or very good. The proportion who described themselves as White British was 96.9%, with all white ethnic groups making up 97.9% of the population. The ethnic make-up of the rest of the population was 0.88% mixed/multiple ethnic groups, 0.56% Indian/Pakistani/Bangladeshi, 0.18% Chinese, 0.15% other Asian, 0.28% Black and 0.046% other. 2.2% of Hednesford's residents were born outside the United Kingdom.

The responses to the voluntary question "What is your religion?" were 'No religion' (23.3%), Christian (69.8%), Buddhist (0.18%), Hindu (0.17%), Jewish (0.006%), Muslim (0.21%), Sikh (0.21%) and other religion (0.26%). 5.9% gave no answer.

Civil parish
The civil parish of Hednesford constitutes 96.8% of the population of the town. In the 2011 census it had 16,789 residents, 7,239 dwellings, and 7,058 households.

Transport
Hednesford railway station re-opened in April 1989 by British Rail. It is on the Chase Line with links operated by current franchise West Midlands Railway to Rugeley, Walsall and Birmingham. In 2019, a new London service launched.

Chaserider operate four main bus services:
25/26 Cannock - Pye Green circulars
62 Cannock - Burntwood - Lichfield 
63 Cannock - Rugeley

Education
Built as Littleworth Secondary Modern Boys/Girls School, Kingsmead School, previously known as Kingsmead Technology College, and Staffordshire University Academy, previously known as Blake High School and Blake Valley Technology College, are both secondary schools for pupils aged 11–18 that serve the area. Both have academy status, too. Hednesford Valley High School is a school for children with special educational needs, which services the local and wider areas.

Hednesford and the surrounding areas (Heath Hayes, Pye Green etc.) also contain many primary schools.

These include: 
              
 West Hill Primary School
 Pye Green Academy
 Red Hill Primary School
 Moor Hill Primary School
 Hazleslade Primary School
 Gorsemoor Primary School
 Heath Hayes Primary School
 St Peter's C of E Primary School
 St Joseph's Catholic Primary School
 Longford Primary School
 St Lukes

Sport
The town is best known for Hednesford Hills Raceway, the stock car track built on the site of a disused reservoir, which has brought tens of thousands of race fans to the area since the mid-1950s and still attracts crowds of several thousand to its major events.

The town's semi-professional football team, Hednesford Town F.C., nicknamed "the Pitmen", currently play in the Southern League Premier Division Central and won the FA Trophy in 2004.

The town's most prominent sportsperson is former footballer Brian Horton, who played for the Pitmen in the late sixties and early seventies. After a long professional career, he went on to manage Manchester City, Macclesfield Town and Port Vale amongst others, and is currently assistant manager of Championship side Doncaster Rovers.

Notable people
 Lynda Grier, CBE (1880–1967), educational administrator, policy advisor, and principal of Lady Margaret Hall, Oxford
 George Henry Jones (1884–1956) a British trade unionist and local politician
 Thomas Hughes (1885-1942), World War I Irish Victoria Cross recipient lived and worked in racing stables at Hednesford before enlisting.
 Lieutenant General Sir Alan Reay, KBE, FRCP, CStJ (1925–2012) a senior British Army officer, Director General Army Medical Services 1981–1984.
 Phil Ford (born 1960) screenwriter e.g. Doctor Who & Wizards vs Aliens
 David Picken (born 1963) a British Anglican priest, Archdeacon of Lancaster since 2020
 Kate Walsh (born 1982) business woman, runner-up in BBC's The Apprentice in 2009
 Ian Smith (born 1978) Actor

Sport 

 Jack Miller (1875–1949) an English footballer, with over 300 caps for Wolverhampton Wanderers and Stoke
 Tom Lyons (1885–1938) an English footballer with 289 caps and cricketer for Staffordshire
 Harry Rogers (1889–1956), cricketer who played for Worcestershire
 Joe Birch (1904–1980) an English professional footballer, more than 200 appearances
 Rob Finch (1908-2000) an association football player, 216 senior appearances for WBA 
 Harry Lane (1909–1977) an English professional footballer who scored 74 goals in 271 appearances
 Les Talbot (1910–1983), professional footballer with over 200 pro appearances
 Tom Galley (1915–2000) an English international footballer, over 200 caps, mainly for Wolverhampton Wanderers.
 Brian Horton (born 1949) an English former footballer, over 600 pro appearances also assistant manager
 Mark Smith (born c.1965) a British auto racing driver

See also
Listed buildings in Hednesford

References

External links
Hednesford Town Council

 
Towns in Staffordshire
Cannock Chase District
Civil parishes in Staffordshire
Mining communities in England